Marshall is a U.S. city in Michigan.  It is the county seat of Calhoun County.  The population was 7,088 at the 2010 census. 

Marshall is best known for its cross-section of 19th- and early 20th-century architecture. It has been referred to by the keeper of the National Register of Historic Places as a "virtual textbook of 19th-Century American architecture." Its historic center is the Marshall Historic District, one of the nation's largest architecturally significant National Historic Landmark Districts. The Landmark has over 850 buildings, including the world-famous Honolulu House.

History 

The town was founded by Sidney Ketchum (1797-1862) in 1830, a land surveyor who had been born in Clinton County, New York, in conjunction with his brother, George Ketchum (1794-1853). The Ketchum brothers explored central lower Michigan in 1830, and in late 1830 Sidney Ketchum obtained government grants for the land on which most of Marshall now stands. The early settlers named the community in honor of Chief Justice of the United States John Marshall from Virginia—whom they greatly admired. This occurred five years before Marshall's death and thus was the first of dozens of communities and counties named for him. The village of Marshall was incorporated March 28, 1836.

Marshall was thought to be the frontrunner for state capital, so much so that a  Governor's Mansion was built, but the town lost by one vote to Lansing. In the years thereafter, Marshall became known for its patent medicine industry until the  Pure Drug Act of 1906. Marshall was involved in the Underground Railroad. When escaped slave Adam Crosswhite fled Kentucky and settled in Marshall with his wife and three children, the people of the town hid him from the posse sent to retrieve him. Those involved were tried in Federal Court and found guilty of denying a man his rightful property. This case and others like it caused the Fugitive Slave Act of 1850 to be pushed through Congress.

Two Marshall citizens, Rev. John D. Pierce and lawyer Isaac E. Crary, innovated the Michigan school system and established it as part of the  state constitution. Their method and format were later adopted by all the states in the old Northwest Territory and became the foundation for the  Morrill Land-Grant Act in 1862, which established schools like Michigan State University all over the country. Pierce became the country's first state superintendent of public instruction and Crary Michigan's first member of the U.S. House.

The first railroad labor union in the U.S., The Brotherhood of the Footboard (later renamed the Brotherhood of Locomotive Engineers and Trainmen), was formed in Marshall in 1863. Marshall was one of the only stops between Chicago and Detroit and became known as the Chicken Pie city because the only thing one could get to eat in the time it took to cool and switch engines was a chicken pie. A replica of the city's roundhouse can be seen at the Greenfield Village outdoor living history museum in Dearborn, Michigan.

On July  2010, an oil pipeline, owned by Enbridge Energy, ruptured, spilling over 850,000 gallons of crude oil into Talmadge Creek and into the Kalamazoo, River. The event received national attention as it was at that time the largest oil spill in the inside the United States. The event was known as the Kalamazoo River Oil Spill. 

In 2012 the U.S. National Transportation Safety Board stated the Enbridge oil spill in the Kalamazoo River near Marshall was the costliest onshore cleanup in U.S. history.

In 2018, the Marshall Area Economic Development Alliance began promoting the "Marshall Megasite," as a Mega Industrial Park. The proposed site is a 1,600 acre tract of rural land (owned by separate landowners) just outside Marshall's city limits.

Stand against slavery 
In 1843, Adam Crosswhite, his wife Sarah and their four children ran away from Francis Giltner's plantation in Hunter's Bottom, Carroll County, Kentucky because the Crosswhites learned that one of their four children was to be sold. The Crosswhites made the tough journey north through Indiana along the Underground Railroad, beginning in Madison, Indiana. They finally settled in Marshall where they were accepted and Adam worked and built a cabin. 

In response to increasing numbers of runaway slaves, a coalition of slave owners in the north central counties and the Bluegrass region of Kentucky organized to recover the runaways. In January of 1846, Francis Giltner's son David Giltner and three others went to Marshall to capture the Crosswhite family.

On the morning of January 26, 1847, as the slave catchers and a local deputy sheriff were pounding on Adam's door, his neighbors heard the noise and came running. The cry of "slave catchers!" was yelled through the streets of Marshall. Soon over 100 people surrounded the Crosswhite home.

Threats were shouted back and forth. One of the slave catchers began to demand that people in the crowd give him their names. They were proud to tell him and even told him the correct spelling.  Each name was written down in a little book.  Finally, the deputy sheriff, swayed by the crowd's opinion, decided he should arrest the men from Kentucky instead. Marshall townspeople hid the Crosswhites in the attic of George Ingersoll's mill. By the time the slave catchers could post bond and get out of jail, Isaac Jacobs, the hostler at the Marshall House, had hired a covered wagon and driven the Crosswhites to  Jackson where they boarded a train to Detroit and then crossed over into Canada.

The Giltners sued some of the people from Marshall for damages in what is known in federal records as the Giltner v. Gorham case. It was tried in the federal court in Detroit. The Giltner v Gorham case resulted in two trials in federal court in Detroit, the first trial ending in a hung jury. At the conclusion of the second trial, the sole remaining defendant in the case, local banker Charles T. Gorham, was ordered to pay the value of the slaves plus court costs. To curry political favor, Detroit entrepreneur Zachariah Chandler supposedly stepped in to pay these costs on Gorham's behalf.

Because of the Crosswhite Affair and many others like it, Sen. Henry Clay from Kentucky pushed a new law through Congress in 1850 known as the Fugitive Slave Law, which made it very risky for anyone to help an escaped slave.

Geography

Demographics

Marshall is part of the Battle Creek, Michigan Metropolitan Statistical Area.

2010 census
As of the census of 2010, there were 7,088 people, 3,092 households, and 1,840 families residing in the city. The racial makeup of the city was 95.1% White, 1.1% African American, 0.6% Native American, 0.7% Asian, 0.7% from other races, and 1.8% from two or more races. Hispanic or Latino of any race were 3.8% of the population.

There were 3,092 households, of which 30.0% had children under the age of 18 living with them, 43.2% were married couples living together, 11.9% had a female householder with no husband present, 4.5% had a male householder with no wife present, and 40.5% were non-families. 34.9% of all households were made up of individuals, and 15.8% had someone living alone who was 65 years of age or older. The average household size was 2.25 and the average family size was 2.90.

The median age in the city was 40.5 years. 24% of residents were under the age of 18; 7.8% were between the ages of 18 and 24; 23.8% were from 25 to 44; 26.3% were from 45 to 64; and 18.2% were 65 years of age or older. The gender makeup of the city was 47.5% male and 52.5% female.

2000 census
As of the census of 2000, there were 7,459 people, 3,111 households, and 1,935 families residing in the city. The racial makeup of the city was 95.91% White, 0.32% African American, 0.43% Native American, 0.59% Asian, 0.99% from other races, and 1.76% from two or more races. Hispanic or Latino of any race were 3.16% of the population.

There were 3,111 households, out of which 30.9% had children under the age of 18 living with them, 48.5% were married couples living together, 10.0% had a female householder with no husband present, and 37.8% were non-families. 32.9% of all households were made up of individuals, and 15.0% had someone living alone who was 65 years of age or older.  The average household size was 2.33 and the average family size was 2.98.

In the city, the population was spread out, with 25.0% under the age of 18, 7.3% from 18 to 24, 28.2% from 25 to 44, 21.2% from 45 to 64, and 18.3% who were 65 years of age or older.  The median age was 38 years. For every 100 females, there were 86.0 males.  For every 100 females age 18 and over, there were 81.2 males.

The median income for a household in the city was $41,171, and the median income for a family was $53,317. Males had a median income of $41,446 versus $30,398 for females. The per capita income for the city was $22,101.  About 2.6% of families and 5.0% of the population were below the poverty line, including 3.2% of those under age 18 and 3.9% of those age 65 or over.

Festivals
The Marshall Historic Home Tour, the oldest historic home tour in the Great Lakes area, is held annually the weekend after Labor Day.  The tour features eight private historic homes, a church, a business, and eight museums open for the two days of the tour.  There is also musical entertainment,  a juried craft show,  and a Civil War Ball with elaborate costumes on Saturday night.  The tour, now in its 50th year, is presented by the Marshall Historical Society.
Cruise to the Fountain features about 1,000 classic cars from the 1950s and 1960s the weekend before the Fourth of July at the Calhoun County Fairgrounds.  On Friday and Saturday nights the cars cruise from the Fairgrounds through the downtown, around the Brooks Memorial Fountain and back.
Blues Fest is held each June, with blues musicians from all over the Midwest performing downtown, complete with food vendors and a beer tent with local Dark Horse beer and a variety of beers from Dan Henry Distributing.
Skeleton Fest held the last Saturday in September, over 30 whimsically posed skeletons take over the downtown area.  There is a free, family-friendly kick-off party for the kids, followed by a Pub & Grub crawl for the adults.
The Monday after Thanksgiving is the date of the annual Christmas Parade. There are typically over 100 entries for this parade. It averages 6–10 bands and 20-40 floats. Santa's arrival to Marshall is always the highlight of this event.
Marshall Historical Society's Christmas Candlelight Walk features five private homes on tour in a small group setting.  Limited tickets are sold for Saturday and Sunday afternoon and evening walks.  The Walk, now in its 40th year, is held annually in early December.
 On the second weekend in June and first weekend in October, the Fiber Arts & Animals Festival is held.  This festival has been held since 2005.

Transportation

Major highways
, a north–south freeway connecting with Fort Wayne, Indiana, to the south and Lansing to the north.
, an east–west route connecting with Battle Creek and Kalamazoo on the west and  Jackson and Detroit on the east.
 runs through downtown.
 runs westerly from Marshall through Battle Creek and on to Kalamazoo.
 has as its northern terminus at BL I-94 (Michigan Avenue) on the west side of Marshall, near I-69.

Public Transportation
The city of Marshall provides Demand responsive transport bus service during the week with no service provided on weekends or major holidays.
Amtrak, the national passenger rail system, provides daily service to nearby Battle Creek, Michigan and Albion, Michigan, operating its Wolverine both directions between Chicago, Illinois and Pontiac, Michigan, via Detroit.

Airport
Brooks Field is a non-towered General Aviation airfield owned and operated by the city of Marshall. The airport features a single runway (10/28) 3500 x 75 feet, helipad, public and private hangars, lighted wind indicator, segmented circle, compass rose, and a tie down apron.

Notable people
 Gwen Robinson Awsumb, mid-20th century politician and social activist
 John Bellairs, fantasy author best known for The House with a Clock in Its Walls
 Cyrus W. Cole, highly decorated U.S. Navy officer with the rank of Rear Admiral
 Ryan A. Conklin, author and castmember of Real World: Brooklyn and Return To Duty
Adam Gase, former head coach of the New York Jets
 Homer Hazel, all-American college football player
 Jamie Hyneman, co-host of the TV series MythBusters
 Belle K. Maniates, novelist and short story writer
 Sharon Miller, professional golfer and winner of two LPGA Tour tournaments
 John Morse, professional golfer

Notable businesses
 Dark Horse Brewery
 Honolulu House
 The last Kmart in the state of Michigan (which closed November 21, 2021)

Museums and historical markers
The second-largest U.S. Postal Service museum is in Marshall.  Its 4,000 artifacts—including uniforms, rural carrier memorabilia, rural post office equipment, automobiles and sleds—are eclipsed only by the collection of the Smithsonian Institution Smithsonian National Postal Museum in Washington D.C.  It was established in 1986, and is in the basement of the historical Schragg Marshall post office (named after Michael Schragg, a former postmaster)  See U.S. Postal Museums.

There are many recognized Michigan historical markers in Marshall, including

 Adam Crosswhite
 American Museum of Magic
 Butler-Boyce House / W. D. Boyce
 Calhoun County Fair
 Capitol Hill School
 Charles T. Gorham
 First Baptist Church (Marshall)
  Governor's Mansion
 Grand Army of the Republic / The G. A. R. Hall
  Harold C. Brooks / Fitch Gorham Brooks House
 Hillside / Mary Miller
 Honolulu House
 Isaac Crary and John Pierce / State School System
 Isaac E. Crary House
 James A. Miner
  Jeremiah Cronin. Jr. House / John Bellairs
  John D. Pierce Homesite
 Ketchum Park
 Kmart, one of the few remaining stores in the country
 Lieutenant George A. Woodruff
 Lockwood House / Lockwood Family
 Marshall Historic District
 Marshall Avenue Bridge
  National House
 The Old Stone Barn
  Oliver C. Comstock Jr.
 Pioneer School
 Postmasters / Howard F Young
 Railroad Union Birthplace
 Sam Hill House
 Samuel Coleman House
 Schellenberger Tavern
 Schuler's
 Sidney Ketchum / Marshall House
 Thomas J. O'Brien
 Trinity Episcopal Church / Montgomery Schuyler
 William W. Cook

References

External links

 
  Clarke Historical Library, Central Michigan University, Bibliography on Calhoun County

Cities in Calhoun County, Michigan
County seats in Michigan
Michigan State Historic Sites
Populated places established in 1830
1830 establishments in Michigan Territory